Gymnoscelis tylocera is a moth in the family Geometridae. It was described by Louis Beethoven Prout in 1930. It is endemic to Fiji.

References

Moths described in 1930
tylocera
Endemic fauna of Fiji
Moths of Fiji